Saint Dasya the Soldier or Daysa the Egyptian, was a Christian martyr of the third century. He was born in Tanda, Egypt (modern Tida in Kafr el-Sheikh Governorate), and served as a soldier in the Roman army. Refusing to deny Christ, Dasya was tortured by Arianus, governor of Ansena, who inflicted great tortures on him, eventually cutting off his head.

He is a saint in the Coptic Church and Ethiopian Orthodox Tewahedo Church. His feast in the Coptic Orthodox Church is on 2 Thout.

References

Ethiopian saints
3rd-century Christian martyrs
3rd-century Christian saints
Saints from Roman Egypt
Egyptian torture victims
Year of birth missing
Year of death missing
Place of birth missing